Lieutenant General Peter Mbogo Njiru, is a Kenyan military officer, who serves as the Commander, Kenya Army, since July 2022. The Kenya Army is a service branch of the Kenya Defence Forces (KDF). Before his present assignment, General Njiru was the commander of the Kenya Joint Command and Staff College, at the rank of Major General.

Background and education
According to his profile at the Kenya Ministry of Defence, he enlisted in the Kenya Army in June 1985 as an Officer Cadet. He graduated in June 1986 as a Second Lieutenant and was posted to an artillery unit, later rising to commanding officer of the unit.

He has studied in many varied military and academic institutions both in Kenya and other countries. He holds a Master of Arts in International Security from King's College London and has attended the Royal College of Defence Studies Course administered once annually by the Royal College of Defence Studies, in London, United Kingdom.
Other courses attended include the "Junior Command Course, Grade 2 Staff Course, Peace Support Operations, African Disarmament Course, Joint Senior Command Course, International Battle Group Commanders Course, Next Generation of Military Leaders Course" and others.

Career
On 20 July 2022, Uhuru Kenyatta, the president of Kenya at that time, appointed Lieutenant General Peter Mbogo Njiru, as the 22nd Commander of the Kenyan Army. He replaced Lieutenant General Walter Koipaton Raria, who retired from the Kenya military, later in 2022. The handover ceremony took place at the Department of Defence Headquarters in Nairobi, on 8 August 2022.

As of  July 2022, during the 36 years in the Kenya Defence Forces, he had held many leadership positions in the KDF, including Staff Officer One, responsible for Operations, Plans, Doctrine and Training (OPD&T) at the KDF headquarters, in Nairobi. In addition, he served as the "Commandant Recruits Training School, Commandant Kenya Military Academy, Commandant Joint Command and Staff College". He also served as aide-de-camp (ADC) to president Uhuru Kenyatta, when he was the Commander-in-Chief of the KDF.

Other considerations
He was a Commanding Officer of the Kenyan Battalion as part of the United Nations Mission in South Sudan (UNMISS). He also served as a Staff Officer in United Nations Mission in Ethiopia and Eritrea (UNMEE). He was awarded the Chief of the Burning Spear (CBS) medal by Uhuru Kenyatta, the President of Kenya and Commander-in-Chief of the Kenya Defence Forces.

Personal
He is a married father of three children.

See also
 Kenya Navy
 Kenya Air Force
 Kenya Coast Guard Service

References

External links
 President Kenyatta Promotes Former Aide Njiru In Key Military Changes As of 21 July 2022.

Succession table

Personnel of the Kenya Army
Living people
Year of birth missing (living people)
Graduates of the Royal College of Defence Studies
Alumni of King's College London
Chiefs of the Order of the Burning Spear